Sahibaan is a 1993 Indian Hindi-language romantic drama film directed by Ramesh Talwar. It features Rishi Kapoor, Sanjay Dutt and Madhuri Dixit in the lead roles. It marked Kapoor's third onscreen collaboration with Talwar after Doosra Aadmi (1977) and Zamana (1985) and second with Dutt as well after Hathyar (1989).  

The film was a "Semi Hit" at the box office.

Cast

 Rishi Kapoor as Gopi
 Sanjay Dutt as Kunwar Vijay Pal Singh
 Madhuri Dixit as Sahibaan
 Sonu Walia as Rajkumari Razee
 Bharat Kapoor as Diwan Durga 'Durge' Singh
 Kiran Kumar as Tikka
 Satyendra Kapoor as Balakram
 Javed Khan as Kheru
 Anjana Mumtaz as Mrs. Balakram
 Beena Banerjee as Mrs. Tikka
 Mangal Dhillon as Police Inspector
 Tinnu Anand as Inder - film director
 Sudhir Pandey as Inder's Guide

Soundtrack
Anand Bakshi wrote the songs.

References

External links
 

1993 films
Indian romantic drama films
1990s Hindi-language films
Films scored by Shiv-Hari
1993 romantic drama films
Hindi-language romance films
Films directed by Ramesh Talwar